The Freedom People's Congress ( Nidahasa Janatha Sabha) is a political party in Sri Lanka founded by Dullas Alahapperuma, G. L. Peiris and several other former Sri Lanka Podujana Peramuna MPs in 2022.

History
The party was formed after a faction of Sri Lanka Podujana Peramuna MPs led by Dullas Alahapperuma defected from the Rajapaksa-led party on 31 August 2022, and chose to sit in opposition as an independent group of MPs. This followed Alahapperuma's decision to stand in the 2022 presidential election, against the wishes of the majority of his party, who instead supported then-acting President Ranil Wickremesinghe.

A few days after the defection, the newly independent group named themselves the Freedom People's Congress, opening an office in Nawala.

Ideology
Founding member Charitha Herath stated that the party's aim was to introduce reforms to free Sri Lankan politics from corruption and nepotism and instead promote meritocracy.

The party's strategic framework emphasised the need to create political freedom and economic freedom, primarily through fiscal conservatism and free market capitalist economic policies, but also including interventionist policies such as foreign exchange controls.

Electoral history
The faction is expected to contest the 2023 Sri Lankan local elections as part of the Freedom People's Alliance, a political alliance also including the Sri Lanka Freedom Party and the Supreme Lanka Coalition.

References 

2022 establishments in Sri Lanka
Nationalist parties in Sri Lanka
Political parties established in 2022
Political parties in Sri Lanka
Sinhalese nationalist parties